The 5th Dimension is an American popular music vocal group. Their music encompasses sunshine pop, pop soul and psychedelic soul.

Formed as the Versatiles in late 1965, the group changed its name to "the 5th Dimension" by 1966. Between 1967 and 1973 they charted with 20 top 40 hits on [[Billboard Hot 100|Billboard'''s Hot 100]], two of which – "Up, Up and Away" (no. 7, 1967) and the 1969 number one "Medley: Aquarius/Let the Sunshine In (The Flesh Failures)" — won the Grammy Award for Record of the Year. Other big hits include "Stoned Soul Picnic" (no. 3), "Wedding Bell Blues" (no. 1), "One Less Bell to Answer" (no. 2), a cover of "Never My Love" (pop no. 12/Easy Listening no. 1), "(Last Night) I Didn't Get to Sleep at All" (no. 8), and "If I Could Reach You" (pop no. 10/Easy Listening no. 1). Three of their records reached the top ten of Billboard's Rhythm & Blues/Soul chart. Five of their 19 top 20 hits on the Easy Listening chart reached number one.

The five original members were Lamonte McLemore, Marilyn McCoo, Florence LaRue, Ronald Townson, and Billy Davis Jr. Their earliest recordings were on the Soul City record label, which was started by recording artist Johnny Rivers. The group later recorded for Bell/Arista Records, ABC Records, and Motown Records.

Some of the songwriters who worked with the 5th Dimension went on to careers of their own, especially Ashford & Simpson, who wrote the song "California Soul". The group is also notable for having more success with the songs of Laura Nyro than Nyro did herself, particularly with "Stoned Soul Picnic", "Sweet Blindness", "Wedding Bell Blues", "Blowin' Away" and "Save the Country". The group also recorded songs by well-known songwriters including Burt Bacharach and Hal David ("One Less Bell to Answer") and Jimmy Webb, who wrote "Up, Up and Away". The group's 1967 LP The Magic Garden features all but one song composed by Webb.

The 5th Dimension's producer Bones Howe used Bob Alcivar as the singers' vocal arranger as well as instrumental backing by the Wrecking Crew for their recording sessions.

Career
Formation

In the early 1960s, Lamonte McLemore and Marilyn McCoo got together with three friends from Los Angeles—Harry Elston, Lawrence Summers, and Fritz Baskett—to form a group called 'the Hi-Fis' (which later became 'the Vocals'). In 1963, they sang at local clubs while taking lessons from a vocal coach. In 1964, they came to the attention of Ray Charles, who took them on tour with him the following year. He produced a single by the group, "Lonesome Mood", a jazz-type song that gained local attention. However, internal disagreements caused Elston to go his own way, eventually leading to his forming the Friends of Distinction with latter day Hi-Fis member Floyd Butler.

McLemore sought to form another group and started looking for members to join him and McCoo. McCoo, who had studied with the respected vocal coach Eddie Beal, had appeared in high school and college musical productions and was known for her ability to do torch songs. McLemore found Florence LaRue, who had received training in singing, dancing, and violin; and who won the talent portion at the Miss Bronze California contest, which McLemore was assigned to photograph. McCoo had won the contest the prior year. About the same time LaRue was approached to join the group, McLemore recruited an old friend from St. Louis, Missouri, Ronald Townson, who had sung choir previously. His grandmother had arranged for voice and acting lessons as he grew up. In his teens, Townson toured with Dorothy Dandridge and Nat King Cole, joined the Wings Over Jordan Choir, and played a small part in the film Porgy and Bess. He demonstrated his skill as a classical artist by placing third in the Metropolitan Opera auditions held in St. Louis. After finishing high school, he worked his way through Lincoln University by conducting the school and church choir. After graduating, he organized his own 25-member gospel choir.

Another of McLemore's friends from St. Louis was Billy Davis Jr., who also had sung choir. Davis later saved enough money to buy a cocktail lounge in St. Louis, which he also used as a base for experimenting with musical groups. When asked to join McLemore's new group, he agreed, while hoping for a solo contract from Motown.

Major hits

The members began rehearsing as the Versatiles in late 1965 and auditioned for Marc Gordon, who headed the Motown's Los Angeles office. Berry Gordy, the head of Motown Records, declined the group, but Gordon still believed in them and wanted to manage them. Gordon brought them to the attention of Johnny Rivers, who had just started his own label, Soul City Records. Soul City signed the group and in November 1966 released their first single as the 5th Dimension, "I'll Be Lovin' You Forever". However, the song failed to chart.
 
In 1967 the 5th Dimension recorded "Go Where You Wanna Go," which became a breakthrough hit for them. The song was a John Phillips tune and reached No. 16 on the US Hot 100 chart. The group followed this with "Up, Up and Away", which reached No. 7 later that same year and went on to win five Grammy Awards. The following year, the group scored major hit singles with Laura Nyro's songs "Stoned Soul Picnic" (U.S. No. 3) and "Sweet Blindness" (U.S. No. 13). The group received a gold record for their album Stoned Soul Picnic.

That album included "California Soul", which peaked at No. 25 in February 1969. Weeks later the group's success broke wide open, with "Aquarius/Let the Sunshine In" from the musical Hair topping the Hot 100 for six straight weeks in April and May and another Nyro song, "Wedding Bell Blues", doing the same for the first three full weeks in November. Their cover of Neil Sedaka's "Workin' On a Groovy Thing" went to No. 20 in between. Those four singles kept the group on the Hot 100 for all but four weeks in 1969. By some reckonings, "Aquarius/Let the Sunshine In" was the biggest hit single for 1969.

Later top 20 hits included 1970's "One Less Bell to Answer" (U.S. No. 2), 1971's "Love's Lines, Angles and Rhymes" (U.S. No. 19) and "Never My Love" (U.S. No. 12), and 1972's "(Last Night) I Didn't Get to Sleep at All" (U.S. No. 8) and "If I Could Reach You" (U.S. No. 10). The group had seven other top 40 hits, the last being 1973's "Living Together, Growing Together" (U.S. No. 32) from the film Lost Horizon.

TV appearances
The 5th Dimension performed "Sweet Blindness" on Frank Sinatra's 1968 TV special Francis Albert Sinatra Does His Thing and appeared on The Ed Sullivan Show twice in 1969. The group performed and sang "California Soul", and a medley consisting of "What the World Needs Now Is Love" and the Beatles' "All You Need Is Love", on February 23, 1969, and performed and sang "Aquarius/Let the Sunshine In" on May 18, 1969, the day after the medley fell from the Hot 100 summit. That same year the group appeared on the British show This Is Tom Jones, singing "Aquarius/Let the Sunshine In" and "Got My Mojo Workin'".

The 5th Dimension were the featured act of a July 28, 1969, CBS broadcast of highlights from the Harlem Cultural Festival, the "Black Woodstock" gathering in Mount Morris Park that drew 300,000 festival attendees over six shows. The New York Times reported the 5th Dimension show drew 60,000 alone. The group's performance at the festival appears in the 2021 music documentary Summer of Soul. Billy Davis and Marilyn McCoo discuss the group's career and their performance at the festival in the film.

The group sang "Workin' On a Groovy Thing" and "Wedding Bell Blues" on Woody Allen's The Woody Allen Special in 1969. They introduced "Puppet Man" and "One Less Bell To Answer" as guests in the It Takes a Thief episode "To Sing a Song of Murder" in 1970.The 5th Dimension: An Odyssey in the Cosmic Universe of Peter Max, a television special, aired on CBS on May 21, 1970.

During the last season of The Ed Sullivan Show, Sullivan dedicated the entire February 21, 1971, episode to the fifth anniversary of the 5th Dimension. The group opened the show with "Love's Lines, Angles and Rhymes" and later joined Connie Stevens for "Puppet Man". They came back for the last 15 minutes of the show and sang their hits "Up – Up and Away", "One Less Bell to Answer", "Stoned Soul Picnic", "Wedding Bell Blues", and finished up with "Aquarius/Let the Sunshine In". This appearance was the group's last on Sullivan, given the Sullivan show's cancellation was announced the following month.

On August 18, 1971, their television special, The 5th Dimension Traveling Sunshine Show, first aired. The group also performed in Burt Bacharach in Shangri-La, a 1973 special attempting to promote Lost Horizon.The 5th Dimension made appearances on Soul Train, American Bandstand, The Flip Wilson Show, The Mike Douglas Show, and The Tonight Show Starring Johnny Carson.

Regrouping
In 1975, McCoo and Davis, who had married on July 26, 1969, left the group to do collective and individual projects. The duo had success with "Your Love" and the chart topper "You Don't Have to Be a Star (To Be in My Show)", which won them their seventh Grammy award as well as their own television variety show, The Marilyn McCoo & Billy Davis Jr. show. Marilyn McCoo served a lengthy 1980s stint as the host of the TV show Solid Gold.

The remaining trio carried on with new members and nearly had a hit in 1976 with the LaRue-sung "Love Hangover". However, Motown issued Diana Ross' original version shortly after the 5th Dimension's, and their version peaked much further down the charts than hers, which soared to the top. The group signed with Motown not long after, releasing two albums in 1978. R&B singer Lou Courtney was in the group briefly in 1978 and 1979, Joyce Wright joined in 1979, and Phyllis Battle joined in 1988. Greg Walker, formerly with the band Santana, joined the group in the early 90's and Cydney Wayne Davis sang with the group briefly during the summer of 1996 and then went on to be a backup singer for Marilyn McCoo and Billy Davis Jr. in 1997.

The original members Davis, McCoo, LaRue, Townson and McLemore joined again for selected private engagements in the late 1990s billed as The Original 5th Dimension under the management and direction of Jason Winters. During that time the re-grouped 5th Dimension continued to tour as well as Marilyn McCoo & Billy Davis Jr. with a show they called "It Takes Two."

After Ron Townson died in 2001 and Lamont McLemore retired from the music business, Florence Larue stepped up to continue the legacy of the group as the only original member.

Reunion and departure
The original quintet reunited in 1990 and 1991 for a tour. Townson left the group to try a solo career but soon returned to the group, as the group resigned itself to the nostalgia circuit. In 1995, the quintet of LaRue, Townson, McLemore, Battle, and Greg Walker recorded a new album, In the House, for Click Records. In 1998, Willie Williams replaced Townson, who died in 2001 due to kidney failure. Battle departed in 2002, to be replaced by Van Jewell. McLemore left the group in March 2006.

21st century

, the group was actively touring as "the 5th Dimension featuring Florence LaRue", led by LaRue, with Willie Williams, Leonard Tucker, Patrice Morris, and Floyd Smith.

McCoo and Davis, who have been married for over 50 years, continue to tour as their own act titled "Marilyn McCoo and Billy Davis, Jr." In October 2011, McCoo and Davis were featured on the Cliff Richard album, Soulicious, appearing live on stage in the tour of the same name, reprising several of their hits as well as dueting with Richard. In 2013, McCoo and Davis released their own double-CD project: Marilyn McCoo and Billy Davis, Jr. Live.

On February 14, 2015, McLemore released an autobiographical memoir, From Hobo Flats to the 5th Dimension: A Life Fulfilled in Baseball, Photography and Music.

On June 21, 2016, the 5th Dimension featuring Florence LaRue performed in The Villages, Florida, just days after the Orlando nightclub shooting. LaRue took the opportunity to share her thoughts on the shooting: "We will not be terrorized. We know what's happening in the world, but this is a song about good health, love, peace and happiness. We still believe in those things today," she stated before the group performed "Aquarius/Let the Sunshine In".

In November 2017, the 5th Dimension appeared for 18 performances at the Andy Williams Performing Arts Centre in Branson, Missouri, in the Andy Williams Christmas Extravaganza hosted by Jimmy Osmond.

Marilyn McCoo & Billy Davis Jr. continue to tour with their live stage show "Up Up and Away a Musical Fable" featuring Cydney Wayne Davis and Cynthia Bass on background vocals, Darrel Alston as music director and piano/vocals, Major Black on guitar/vocals, Derrick Murdock on bass guitar, Dave Iwataki on Synth/Keys and Steve Harvey on drums.

In 2021 McCoo-Davis released their recording project Blackbird Lennon McCartney Icons which features the music of the Beatles including the title song, "Blackbird", "Ticket to Ride", "And I Love Her" and "Silly Love Songs".

In 2021 the 5th Dimension was featured in the Academy Award-winning Documentary film Summer of Soul produced and directed by QuestLove of the band The Roots.

Honors
The group was inducted into the Vocal Group Hall of Fame in 2002.

They have a star on the Hollywood Walk of Fame, inducted August 9, 1991, and the St. Louis Walk of Fame, inducted on March 18, 2010.

Membership

 Marilyn McCoo (born September 30, 1943, Jersey City, New Jersey)
 Florence LaRue (born February 4, 1942 Philadelphia, Pennsylvania)
 Billy Davis Jr. (born June 26, 1938, St. Louis, Missouri)
 LaMonte McLemore (born September 17, 1939, St. Louis, Missouri)
 Ronald L. "Ron" Townson, nicknamed "Sweets" (born January 20, 1933, St. Louis, Missouri, died August 2, 2001, of kidney failure, Las Vegas, Nevada)

McCoo and Davis left the group in November 1975. Since then, other members have included:
 Eloise Laws (McCoo replacement) 1975
 Danny Beard (Davis replacement) 1975–1978
 Marjorie Barnes (McCoo replacement) 1976–1977
 Terri Bryant (McCoo replacement) 1978–1979
 Mic Bell (Townson replacement) 1978–1979
 Lou Courtney (Davis replacement) 1978–1979
 Pat Bass (McCoo replacement) 1979
 Tanya Boyd (McCoo replacement) 1979
 Joyce Wright Pierce (McCoo replacement) 1979–1986 and 1987
 Michael Procter (Davis replacement) 1979–1988
 Ron Townson 1979–1997
 Estrelita (McCoo replacement) 1986
 Phyllis Battle (McCoo replacement) 1988–2001
 Eugene Barry-Hill (Davis replacement) 1989–1992
 Greg Walker (Davis replacement) 1993–2006
 Cydney Davis (Larue replacement) Summer of 1996
 Willie Williams (Townson replacement) 1998–2018
 Van Jewell (McCoo replacement) 2002, 2005
 Julie Delgado (McCoo replacement) 2002–2005
 Jamila Ajibade (McCoo replacement) 2005–2006 and 2007–2008
 Leonard Tucker (Davis replacement) 2006–present
 Valerie Davis (McCoo replacement) 2006–2007
 Jennifer Leigh Warren (McCoo replacement) 2007
 Gwyn Foxx (McCoo replacement) December 2007
 Michael Mishaw (McLemore replacement) 2006–2008
 Patrice Morris (McCoo replacement) 2008–present
 Floyd Smith (McLemore replacement) 2009–present
 Sidney Jacobs (William replacement) 2018-present 

Discography

 Up – Up and Away (1967)
 The Magic Garden (1968)
 Stoned Soul Picnic (1968)
 The Age of Aquarius (1969)
 Portrait (1970)
 Love's Lines, Angles and Rhymes (1971)
 Individually & Collectively (1972)
 Living Together, Growing Together (1973)
 Soul & Inspiration (1974)
 Earthbound (1975)
 Star Dancing (1978)
 High on Sunshine (1979)
 In the House (1995)

References

Bibliography
 The Encyclopedia of Pop, Rock & Soul (revised edition), Irwin Stambler © 1989 St. Martin's Press, New York
 All Music Guide to Soul'' (article by Steve Huey) © 2003 Backbeat Books San Francisco

External links

 Current Official Site
 Forever 5th Dimension
 Album Review of The Magic Garden
 
 The 5th Dimension Vocal Group Hall of Fame Page
 The 5th Dimension at Wenig-LaMonica Associates
 Ultimate Band List page
 The 5th Dimension Traveling Sunshine Show (1971)

African-American musical groups
American pop music groups
Bell Records artists
Kama Sutra Records artists
Sunshine pop
Co-ed groups